Nona is an unincorporated community in St. Charles County, Missouri, United States.

The namesake of Nona is unknown.

References

Unincorporated communities in St. Charles County, Missouri
Unincorporated communities in Missouri